Fernand Castille (born 28 November 1873, date of death unknown) was a French gymnast. He competed in the men's artistic individual all-around event at the 1908 Summer Olympics.

References

1873 births
Year of death missing
French male artistic gymnasts
Olympic gymnasts of France
Gymnasts at the 1908 Summer Olympics
Sportspeople from Pas-de-Calais